Pleasureman is the only album by Swedish singer Günther. The album was originally released in Sweden in 2004, and an uncensored American version was released by Warner Bros. Records in 2006. In 2007, the album was released in Japan.

Track listing

Charts

References

External links 
 
 

2004 debut albums
Günther (singer) albums
Warner Records albums